The Selby Line is a secondary railway line in Yorkshire, England, linking Leeds to Selby via Micklefield, and then on to Kingston upon Hull (Hull). Hull Trains, London North Eastern Railway, Northern and TransPennine Express operate passenger trains on the line.

One of the crossing boxes at Crabley Creek has remained operational and worked by a Network Rail representative as the original deeds for the acquisition of the land by the railway company dictated that as long as the crossing existed, it should be manned. Most of the boxes were either boarded up or demolished though those at Melton Lane and Gilberdyke junction were retained as welfare facilities for railway workers.

See also 
 Hull and Selby Railway
 Leeds and Selby Railway

References

External links 
 

Transport in Leeds
Railway lines in Yorkshire and the Humber